The inaugural Japan Record Awards were held on December 27, 1959. They recognized musical accomplishments by performers for the year 1959. Hiroshi Mizuhara won the Grand Prix award, defeated Frank Nagai by a vote.

Award winners

Japan Record Award
 Hiroshi Mizuhara (ja) – "Kuroi Hanabira" (ja)
 Lyricist: Rokusuke Ei
 Composer: Hachidai Nakamura
 Record Company: EMI Music Japan

Best Vocal Performance
 Frank Nagai – "Yogiri ni Kaeta Chalk"
 Lyricist: Tetsuo Miyagawa (ja)
 Composer: Masanobu Tokuchi (ja)

Lyricist Award
 Hachirou Satou (ja) – "Flute"
 Singer: Chiyoko Shimakura
 Composer: Yūji Koseki

Composer Award
 Masanobu Tokuchi – "Yogiri ni Kaeta Chalk"
 Singer: Frank Nagai
 Lyricist: Tetsuo Miyagawa

Children's Song Award
 Kamejirō Ishii (ja) and King Hōzuki-kai – "Yasashii Oshō-san"
 Lyricist: Shōgo Katō (ja)
 Composer: Hideaki Yashima (ja)

References

External links
Official Website

Japan Record Awards
Japan Record Awards
Japan Record Awards
1959
Japan Record Awards
Japan Record Awards
Japan Record Awards